Benyounés Lahlou (born 3 November 1964, in Oujda) is a Moroccan runner who specialized in the 400 and 800 metres.

Lahlou finished seventh in 4 x 400 metres relay at the 1991 World Championships, together with teammates Abdelali Kasbane, Ali Dahane and Bouchaib Belkaid.

On the individual level, Lahlou won a silver medal at the 1991 Summer Universiade and a bronze medal at the 1993 Mediterranean Games, both times in the 400 m. Participating in the 1996 Summer Olympics, he finished eighth in the 800 m final.

External links

1964 births
Living people
Moroccan male sprinters
Moroccan male middle-distance runners
Athletes (track and field) at the 1992 Summer Olympics
Athletes (track and field) at the 1996 Summer Olympics
Olympic athletes of Morocco
Universiade medalists in athletics (track and field)
Mediterranean Games bronze medalists for Morocco
Mediterranean Games medalists in athletics
Athletes (track and field) at the 1993 Mediterranean Games
Universiade silver medalists for Morocco
Medalists at the 1991 Summer Universiade
20th-century Moroccan people
21st-century Moroccan people